Love is the fourth studio album by the San Francisco-based punk rock band Flipper, released in 2009. The album was issued more than 16 years after their previous studio album, 1993's American Grafishy. Love is the only Flipper studio album to date to include former Nirvana member Krist Novoselic. Recording sessions took place at Novoselic's studio in Washington.

Love was released simultaneously with the live album Fight, which was recorded in Portland, Oregon, and Seattle. Jack Endino recorded and produced both albums.

Critical reception
The Austin Chronicle wrote: "These old dogs haven't learned any new tricks, but with Jack Endino in the producer's chair and Nirvana bassist Krist Novoselic, they manage a raucous, post-punk retread that, after the teenaged delinquency of 'Be Good, Child!' goes off like 'Sex Bomb' closing 1982's seminal Album: Generic Flipper."

Track listing
All songs written by Bruce Loose, Ted Falconi, Krist Novoselic and Steve DePace.

Musicians and personnel
Flipper
Bruce Loose – lead vocals
Ted Falconi – lead guitar
Krist Novoselic – bass 
Steve DePace – drums

Production personnel
Jack Endino – engineering, production

References 

2009 albums
Flipper (band) albums
Albums produced by Jack Endino